Le comte Ory (Count Ory) is a comic opera written by Gioachino Rossini in 1828. Some of the music originates from his opera Il viaggio a Reims written three years earlier for the coronation of Charles X. The French libretto was by Eugène Scribe and Charles-Gaspard Delestre-Poirson adapted from a comedy they had first written in 1817.

The work is ostensibly a comic opera in that the story is humorous, even farcical. However, it was devised for the Opéra rather than for the Théâtre de l'Opéra-Comique and there are structural inconsistencies with the contemporary opéra comique genre: whereas the latter consists of relatively short lyrical numbers and spoken dialogue, Le comte Ory consists of "highly developed, even massive musical forms linked by accompanied recitative". Although the opera contains some of Rossini's most colorful orchestral writing, the quaint, brief overture is oddly restrained and unassuming, ending with a whisper of pizzicato strings.

Performance history
It was first performed on 20 August 1828 at the Salle Le Peletier by the Paris Opera. It was given in London at the King's Theatre in Italian on 28 February 1829, in New Orleans at the Théâtre d'Orléans on 16 December 1830 and in New York on 22 August 1831.

The work receives numerous productions at opera houses around the world. In April 2011 the opera received its premiere performances at the Metropolitan Opera in New York. The cast included Juan Diego Flórez, Diana Damrau and Joyce DiDonato, singing in a new production directed by Bartlett Sher. This production was broadcast on Metropolitan Opera Live in HD on April 9, 2011. It was revived in 2013 with Flórez repeating his role, but with a different supporting cast.

Roles

Synopsis 
Time: Circa 1200, during the Crusades
Place: Touraine

Act 1 
The countryside before the castle of Formoutiers

Scenes 1–3 
The lords and men of Formoutiers have been away on a crusade. Count Ory, who hopes to seduce Countess Adèle, takes advantage of the situation. Hoping to win her hand, he disguises himself as a hermit, aided by Raimbaud, his friend. Raimbaud announces that a wise hermit will visit the village to offer advice on matters of the heart. The castle is filled with women awaiting their husbands' and brothers' return from the crusades. Ragonde discloses that the countess hopes to have the hermit ease her sadness and Raimbaud assures her that the hermit's skill is unparalleled and has helped many widows find love.

The count Ory, disguised as a hermit, arrives at the castle. The people tell him their wishes and he invites the young ladies to visit him at his hermitage that evening. Ragonde explains that the ladies have sworn to live like widows in the countess's castle while their husbands and brothers are away on the crusade. She tells the disguised Ory that Countess Adèle wishes to speak with him to which he enthusiastically agrees. Ory retires to the hermitage with the women.

Scenes 4–6 
Ory's page Isolier and the tutor arrive on the scene, resting from their journey in the shade. They explain that the count Ory, who is under the tutor's care, has disappeared. The tutor explains that he is searching for Ory at the behest of Ory's father ("Veiller sans cesse"). When the tutor asks why the page brought him to this place, it is revealed that Isolier wishes to visit the countess's castle.

The ladies and other peasants exit the hermitage. When the tutor sees the pretty girls, he suspects the count is near. The women tell him the hermit came to town eight days ago – the same day the count disappeared from the tutor's watch. His suspicions deepen.

Scene 7 
Isolier is in love with the countess. He doesn't recognize Ory in disguise, and Isolier confides his love to the hermit, explaining his plan to sneak into the castle disguised as a female pilgrim (Duet: "Une dame de haut parage"). Isolier asks for the hermit's help: when the countess comes to him for advice, he should tell her that her torment is caused by her indifference and that the cure is to love Isolier. Ory likes this idea, but he is resolved to use it for his own ends.

Scene 8 
Countess Adèle consults the hermit about a cure for her melancholia ("En proie à la tristesse"). He proposes that she fall in love, which she promptly does, with Isolier. The "hermit" warns her not to trust "the faithful page of the terrible Count Ory" and she leads him to the castle.

Scene 9 
The tutor recognizes Raimbaud and Ory and everyone is shocked when the count's identity is revealed. Adèle receives a letter from her brother announcing that the crusade is over and the men will return to their homeland within two days.

Act 2 
A large room in the castle

Scenes 1–4 
A terrible storm persuades the countess and her attendants to welcome a group of fourteen pilgrims surprised by the elements. These pilgrims are actually Ory and his men in disguise. Ory's new disguise is as "Sister Colette". Left alone with the countess, Ory passionately approaches her (Duet: "Ah! quel respect, Madame").

Scenes 5–8 
Served only milk and fruit for dinner, the "pilgrims" note the lack of wine. Raimbaud to the rescue – he has broken into the castle wine cellar and returns with enough for everyone. They toast the countess's absent brother ("Dans ce lieu solitaire"). Ragonde enters to check on them and they pretend to pray, hiding the bottles. She returns with the countess, who praises them for their piety.

Scene 9 
Isolier arrives at the castle to let the women know that their husbands and brothers will be arriving at midnight. Upon hearing that the ladies have welcomed a group of pilgrims into the castle, Isolier recognizes that it is Ory and his men. He shares this revelation with the women, who are afraid of what their husbands will think upon finding them in a castle with fourteen men.

Scene 10–11 
After everyone is in bed, Ory enters Countess Adèle's room. He woos her, not realizing in the dark that it is Isolier's hand he is holding (Trio: "À la faveur de cette nuit obscure").

The men return from the crusade. Isolier reveals himself to count Ory and helps him and his men escape from the castle.

Recordings

References
Notes

Cited sources

Further reading
Osborne, Richard (1990), Rossini, Ithaca, New York: Northeastern University Press. 
Osborne, Richard (1998), "Le comte Ory", in Stanley Sadie, (Ed.), The New Grove Dictionary of Opera, Vol. One, p. 913. London: Macmillan Publishers, Inc.  
Osborne, Richard (2004), "Rossini's Life", in Emanuele Senici, (ed.), The Cambridge Companion to Rossini, Cambridge University Press. .
Toye, Francis, Rossini: The Man and His Music, Dover Publications, 1987.  ,

External links

Operas by Gioachino Rossini
French-language operas
1828 operas
Operas
Opera world premieres at the Paris Opera
Operas based on plays
Operas based on works by Eugène Scribe
Operas set in France